The Panther City Lacrosse Club is a professional lacrosse team based in Fort Worth, Texas. The team plays in the National Lacrosse League (NLL). The 2023 season is the second season in franchise history.

Regular season

Final standings

Game log

Roster
References:

Entry Draft
The 2022 NLL Entry Draft took place on September 10, 2022. Panther City made the following selections:

References

Panther City Lacrosse Club
Panther City Lacrosse Club
Panther City LC seasons